The Inside Information Stakes is a Grade II American Thoroughbred horse race for fillies and mares that are four years old or older, over a distance of seven furlongs on the dirt held annually in late January at Gulfstream Park in Hallandale Beach, Florida.  The event currently carries a purse of $200,000.

History

The inaugural running of the event was on 21 April 1976 as the Shirley Jones Stakes over a distance of  miles on the turf track for fillies and mares that were three-year-olds or older. The was won by Roger E. Leslie's Canadian-bred Regal Quillo who started as the 11/10 favorite winning by  lengths. The event was named after the fine mare Shirley Jones who defeated her male counterparts in the inaugural running of the Pan American Handicap at Gulfstream Park in 1962.

During the 1970s the legal inflighting between owner Donn family's Gulfstream Park and John W. Galbreath's Hialeah Park over racing date allotments impacted the scheduling of the event. The event was not held in 1977 or 1978. In 1979 the event was scheduled as a race for three-year-old fillies over a distance of six furlongs on the dirt track. The race was a spectacular clash between two brilliant fillies, Candy Eclair and Davona Dale which Candy Eclair won her seventh straight race to remain undefeated by a  lengths in a scintillating 1:08. 

Again in 1980 the event was not scheduled but in 1981 the event resumed as a seven furlong sprint for fillies and mares that are four years old or older and has currently remains as such.

In 1983, the event was held in two split divisions with both favorites Meringue Pie and Secrettame winning their races. 

The event was upgraded in 1998 by the American Graded Stakes Committee to Grade III race. The event was upgraded to Grade II classification in 2005.

In 2009 the event was renamed to the Inside Information Stakes in honor of the U.S. Racing Hall of Fame racing mare Inside Information, winner of the 1995 Breeders' Cup Distaff who was voted that year's American Champion Older Female Horse. Inside Information ran three times at Gulfstream Park winning twice including the Grade II Bonnie Miss Stakes.

In the 2011 running of the event 3/5 odds-on favorite Hilda's Passion set a new track record for the 7 furlongs distance in her  lengths defeat of five other runners.

Records
Speed record:  
7 furlongs: 1:20.45 – Hilda's Passion (2011)

Margins:
 lengths – Randaroo (2004)

Most wins:
 2 – Love's Exchange (1990, 1991)

Most wins by a jockey:
 6 – John Velazquez (2000, 2003, 2004, 2009, 2017, 2021)

Most wins by a trainer:
 5 – Todd A. Pletcher (2000, 2003, 2009, 2011, 2018)

Most wins by an owner:
 2 – Frances A. Genter (1988, 1993)
 2 – J. Mack Robinson (1990, 1991)
 2 – Eugene Melnyk (2000, 2003)

Winners  

Legend:

See also
List of American and Canadian Graded races

External links
 2021–22 Gulfstream Park Media Guide

References

Graded stakes races in the United States
Sprint category horse races for fillies and mares
Horse races in Florida
Gulfstream Park
Recurring sporting events established in 1976
1976 establishments in Florida
Grade 2 stakes races in the United States